Jigh Jigh (also Romanized as Jīgh Jīgh; also known as Jīq Jīq and Qeshlāq-e Jīgh Jīgh) is a village in Qeshlaq Rural District, Abish Ahmad District, Kaleybar County, East Azerbaijan Province, Iran. At the 2006 census, its population was 79, in 16 families.

References 

Populated places in Kaleybar County